In Greek mythology, the Heliades (Ancient Greek: Ἡλιάδες means 'daughters of the sun') also called Phaethontides (meaning "daughters of Phaethon") were the daughters of Helios and Clymene, an Oceanid nymph.

Names 
According to one version recorded by Hyginus, there were seven Heliades: Merope, Helie, Aegle, Lampetia, Phoebe, Aetheria and Dioxippe. Aeschylus's fragmentary Heliades names Phaethousa and Lampetia, who are otherwise called daughters of Neaera. A scholiast on the Odyssey gives their names as Phaethusa, Lampetia and Aegle.

Mythology 
Their brother, Phaëthon, died after attempting to drive his father's chariot (the sun) across the sky. He was unable to control the horses and fell to his death (according to most accounts, Zeus struck his chariot with a thunderbolt to save the Earth from being set afire). The Heliades grieved for four months and the gods turned them into poplar trees and their tears into amber. According to some sources, their tears (amber) fell into the river Eridanus, in which Phaethon had fallen.

According to Hyginus, the Heliades were turned to poplar trees because they yoked the chariot for their brother without their father Helios' permission.

Notes

References 
 Diodorus Siculus, The Library of History translated by Charles Henry Oldfather. Twelve volumes. Loeb Classical Library. Cambridge, Massachusetts: Harvard University Press; London: William Heinemann, Ltd. 1989. Vol. 3. Books 4.59–8. Online version at Bill Thayer's Web Site
 Diodorus Siculus, Bibliotheca Historica. Vol 1-2. Immanel Bekker. Ludwig Dindorf. Friedrich Vogel. in aedibus B. G. Teubneri. Leipzig. 1888–1890. Greek text available at the Perseus Digital Library.
 Gaius Julius Hyginus, Fabulae from The Myths of Hyginus translated and edited by Mary Grant. University of Kansas Publications in Humanistic Studies. Online version at the Topos Text Project.
 Homer, The Odyssey with an English Translation by A.T. Murray, PH.D. in two volumes. Cambridge, MA., Harvard University Press; London, William Heinemann, Ltd. 1919. Online version at the Perseus Digital Library. Greek text available from the same website.
 Pausanias, Description of Greece with an English Translation by W.H.S. Jones, Litt.D., and H.A. Ormerod, M.A., in 4 Volumes. Cambridge, MA, Harvard University Press; London, William Heinemann Ltd. 1918. Online version at the Perseus Digital Library
 Pausanias, Graeciae Descriptio. 3 vols. Leipzig, Teubner. 1903.  Greek text available at the Perseus Digital Library.
 Publius Ovidius Naso, Metamorphoses translated by Brookes More (1859-1942). Boston, Cornhill Publishing Co. 1922. Online version at the Perseus Digital Library.
 Publius Ovidius Naso, Metamorphoses. Hugo Magnus. Gotha (Germany). Friedr. Andr. Perthes. 1892. Latin text available at the Perseus Digital Library.
 Quintus Smyrnaeus, The Fall of Troy translated by Way. A. S. Loeb Classical Library Volume 19. London: William Heinemann, 1913. Online version at theio.com
 Quintus Smyrnaeus, The Fall of Troy. Arthur S. Way. London: William Heinemann; New York: G.P. Putnam's Sons. 1913. Greek text available at the Perseus Digital Library.
 Pliny the Elder, Pliny – Natural History, 10 volumes. Translated by Rackham, H.; Jones, W. H. S.; Eichholz, D. E. Loeb Classical Library. 1938–1962.
 Smith, William; Dictionary of Greek and Roman Biography and Mythology, London (1873). "Heliadae and Heliads"

External links 

 HELIADES from The Theoi Project

Metamorphoses into trees in Greek mythology
Children of Helios
Nymphs
Metamorphoses characters